WGVS may refer to:

 WGVS (AM), a radio station (850 AM) licensed to Muskegon, Michigan, simulcasting WGVU
 WGVS-FM, a radio station (95.3 FM) licensed to Whitehall, Michigan, simulcasting WGVU-FM